The Port of Salerno is a port serving Salerno, southwestern Italy. The port of Salerno, located in the gulf of the Tyrrhenian Sea, is registered in the class of II category of seaports. It is one of the major domestic ports and plays an important role in the industrial and commercial system of the center-south. In 2009, 18,426,447 tonnes and 562,782 passengers passed through the port.

References

External links
Official site

Ports and harbours of Italy
Salerno